Gwak Dong-han (Hangul: 곽동한; ; born 20 April 1992) is a South Korean judoka. He won the gold medal in the 90 kg event at the 2015 World Judo Championships. He is currently ranked No. 1 in the world (as of 8 February 2016).

He was his coach's Song Dae-nam's training partner at the 2012 Summer Olympics.

Career

2011 World Cup Suwon
Gwak participated in his first senior tournament at home ground at the World Cup in Suwon. He lost in his first fight against Russia's Victor Semenov by ippon, waza-ari and yuko.

2012 World Cup Ulaanbatar
Gwak won his first IJF circuit title at the World Cup in Ulaanbaatar. He defeated Mongolia's Bat-erdene Davaadorj in the final by ippon.

2012 Grand Slam Tokyo
Gwak's first outing to a Grand Slam ended in his first fight. He was defeated by Japan's Yuya Yoshida by ippon in golden score. The fight lasted for over seven minutes.

2012 World Cup Jeju
Gwak reached the final of the World Cup in Jeju, where he narrowly won by decision and yuko in the quarter-final and semi-final. He eventually lost against Japan's Kensei Ikeda by waza-ari, and settled for silver.

2013 Grand Prix Dusseldorf
Gwak lost in his second fight to European champion Varlam Liparteliani by ippon.

2013 Asian Championships
Gwak played ippon judo en route to the final of his first continental tournament, but lost by shido to Japan's Shohei Shimowada, settling for silver.

2013 World Championships
Gwak participated in his first World Championships in Rio de Janeiro. He lost in his third fight to eventual world champion Asley González by ippon.

2013 Grand Slam Tokyo
Gwak's second outing to Tokyo was again stunted in his first fight, losing to two-time world silver medalist Daiki Nishiyama.

2013 Grand Prix Jeju
Gwak won his second IJF circuit title at the Grand Prix in Jeju, causing an upset by defeating legend Ilias Iliadis by ippon with uchi mata.

2014 Grand Slam Paris
Gwak competed in his first Paris Grand Slam and finished fifth, losing to future rival Mashu Baker by ippon and waza-ari.

2014 Asian Championships
Gwak lost in the quarter-final to Mongolia's Otgonbataar Lkhagvasuren by waza-ari, but won in the repechage against Kazakhstan's Timur Bolat. He won bronze after defeating Tajikistan's Komronshokh Ustopiriyon by ippon.

2014 Grand Prix Jeju
Gwak successfully defended his title by winning against Azerbaijan's Mammadali Mehdiyev by ippon and waza-ari in the final.

2014 Grand Slam Tokyo
Gwak won in his third outing to the Grand Slam in Tokyo, defeating three Japanese judokas consecutively. He beat Baker in the quarter-final by waza-ari and yuko, Kenta Nagasawa in the semi-final by shido, and Nishiyama in the final by yuko.

2015 Grand Prix Dusseldorf
Gwak finished fifth in his second outing to the Grand Prix in Düsseldorf, losing to rival Nishiyama in the bronze medal contest by waza-ari.

2015 European Open Warsaw
Gwak participated in his first European Open in Warsaw, and won the tournament by defeating all his opponents by ippon. He faced Lithuania's Karolis Bauza in the final, who was the only one to gain a score against Gwak, but was ultimately defeated.

2015 Asian Championships
Gwak won his first continental title in Kuwait City, making it his second tournament to win all fights by ippon. He defeated long time rival Nishiyama in the final, using his signature skill seoi nage for ippon.

2015 World Championships
Gwak had a breakthrough in his career at the World Championships in Astana. He continued playing ippon judo in his first two fights, however narrowly won by yuko until the semi-final. He defeated Russia's Kirill Denisov in the final by waza-ari, becoming one of South Korea's two world champions in the tournament.

In the team competition, Korea was up against Mongolia in the semi-final. Korea had already sealed the deal by winning the first three fights. Gwak was defeated by Otgonbataar by ippon. Otgonbataar used Gwak's main skill seoi nage against him for a consolation win. According to the IJF commentators, Gwak had no intention of fighting to his maximum to save energy for the final. Korea won 4–1 for a gold medal contest against Japan.

In the final, Gwak was against Yoshida. Japan was up by a point, making it a must-win for Gwak. He narrowly won by shido. Korea ended up settling for silver, losing 3–2.

2015 Grand Prix Tashkent
Gwak surprisingly finished seventh at his first outing as world champion. After winning by ippon against Mihail Marchitan, he lost the quarter-final against Dmitri Gerasimenko and was defeated in the repechage by Karolis Bauza, both by ippon.

2015 Grand Prix Jeju
Gwak won his third consecutive Grand Prix in Jeju, narrowly beating the experienced Magomed Magomedov and Iliadis by shido. He defeated France's Axel Clerget for a waza-ari and yuko, winning the gold medal.

2015 Grand Slam Tokyo
Gwak failed to defend his title at Tokyo, but managed to win bronze. He defeated rival Nishiyama in the quarter-final by shido, however lost to Nishiyama's teammate Baker in the semi-final by ippon in golden score. He won the bronze medal by defeating Russia's Kirill Voprosov by ippon.

2016 Grand Slam Paris
Gwak competed in his second Paris Grand Slam, and was the heavy favorite with the absence of Baker. He faced long-time rival and eventual winner Nishiyama in the quarter-final, and lost by yuko. He won the repechage against Eduardo Bettoni and won the bronze medal by defeating Ciril Grossklaus by waza-ari.

2016 Grand Prix Dusseldorf
Gwak continued his medal-less streak in Düsseldorf when he lost to Sweden's Marcus Nyman in the semi-final by a single yuko. He was set to face fellow countryman Kim Jae-yun, however did not fight due to injury, leaving him to finish fifth place.

2016 Olympic Games

Fighting style

Competitive record

(as of 19 February 2016)

References

External links
 
 Gwak Dong-han at gwangju2015.com

Living people
1992 births
People from Pohang
South Korean male judoka
Judoka at the 2016 Summer Olympics
Judoka at the 2020 Summer Olympics
Olympic judoka of South Korea
Olympic bronze medalists for South Korea
Olympic medalists in judo
Medalists at the 2016 Summer Olympics
Judoka at the 2014 Asian Games
Judoka at the 2018 Asian Games
Asian Games gold medalists for South Korea
Asian Games bronze medalists for South Korea
Asian Games medalists in judo
Medalists at the 2014 Asian Games
Medalists at the 2018 Asian Games
World judo champions
Universiade medalists in judo
Universiade gold medalists for South Korea
Medalists at the 2013 Summer Universiade
Medalists at the 2015 Summer Universiade
Medalists at the 2017 Summer Universiade
Sportspeople from North Gyeongsang Province